Tor Bjørn Andersen is a Norwegian handball player.

He made his debut on the Norwegian national team in 1995, and played 14 matches for the national team between 1995 and 1999. He competed at the 1999 World Men's Handball Championship.

References

Year of birth missing (living people)
Living people
Norwegian male handball players